Xingqinggong Park is a city park in Xi'an, the capital of Shaanxi Province, China. With an area of 743 acres, it is the largest park in Xi'an's city proper.

General
Xingqinggong Park was built in 1958 on the former site of Xinqing Palace (see below), when Xi'an Jiaotong University was established directly in its south. The park's main entrance faces Xi'an Jiaotong University. 

The park has 150 acres of Xingqing Lake and the Chenxiang Pavilion, which is built in the Tang Dynasty architecture.

Xingqing Palace
The Xingqing Palace was originally an old house, called Longqing Fang, where Li Longji lived with his five brothers when he was a prince. After becoming a palace, he changed its name.

At the end of the Tang Dynasty, the Xingqing Palace was destroyed, and by the beginning of the Qing Dynasty, the site gradually became a farmland. 

On May 31, 1957, the Xingqing Palace site was listed as a cultural relic protection unit of Shaanxi Province.

See also 
Xi'an Jiaotong University

References

External link

Geography of Xi'an
Tourist attractions in Xi'an